William George Glenvil Hall (4 April 1887  – 13 October 1962) was a British barrister and Labour politician.

He was elected at the 1929 general election as Member of Parliament (MP) for Portsmouth Central, but lost his seat two years later at the 1931 election, when Labour split over the formation of the National Government. He returned to the House of Commons in 1939, at a by-election in the Colne Valley constituency, and held the seat until he died in office in 1962, aged 75.

In Clement Attlee's post-war government, he served as Financial Secretary to the Treasury from 1945 to 1950, and was made a Privy Councillor in 1947.  After leaving government in 1950, he served as chair of the Parliamentary Labour Party (PLP)'s liaison committee, a position equivalent to the current role of Chairman of the PLP.

References

External links 
 

1887 births
1962 deaths
British barristers
Labour Party (UK) MPs for English constituencies
Members of the Privy Council of the United Kingdom
Ministers in the Attlee governments, 1945–1951
UK MPs 1929–1931
UK MPs 1935–1945
UK MPs 1945–1950
UK MPs 1950–1951
UK MPs 1951–1955
UK MPs 1955–1959
UK MPs 1959–1964